Eukrohniidae is a family of sagittoideans in the order Phragmophora. It consists of a single genus, Eukrohnia von Ritter-Záhony, 1909.

History
The first species of Eukrohniidae, Eukrohnia hamata, was identified by Karl Möbius in 1875. The genus was named Eukrohnia by R. von Ritter-Záhony in 1909 after August David Krohn. The family was named Eukrohniidae by Takasi Tokioka in 1965. One of the species, Eukrohnia fowleri, is bioluminescent.

Species
Eukrohnia bathyantarctica David, 1958
Eukrohnia bathypelagica Alvariño, 1962
Eukrohnia calliops McLelland, 1989
Eukrohnia flaccicoeca Casanova, 1986
Eukrohnia fowleri von Ritter-Záhony, 1909
Eukrohnia hamata (Möbius, 1875)
Eukrohnia kitoui Kuroda, 1981
Eukrohnia macroneura Casanova, 1986
Eukrohnia minuta Silas & Srinivasan, 1969
Eukrohnia proboscidea Furnestin & Ducret, 1965
Eukrohnia sinica Zhang & Chen, 1983

References

Chaetognatha
Monogeneric protostome families